Anukul Sudhakar Roy (born 30 November 1998) is an Indian cricketer who plays for Jharkhand and Kolkata Knight Riders. In December 2017, he was named in India's squad for the 2018 Under-19 Cricket World Cup. He was the joint highest wicket taker in the Under-19 Cricket World Cup.

He was born in Bhirha, Rosera in the state of Bihar.

He made his List A debut for Jharkhand in the 2017–18 Vijay Hazare Trophy on 8 February 2018. He made his first-class debut for Jharkhand in the 2018–19 Ranji Trophy on 1 November 2018. He was the leading wicket-taker for Jharkhand in the tournament, with 30 dismissals in nine matches. He made his Twenty20 debut for Jharkhand in the 2018–19 Syed Mushtaq Ali Trophy on 21 February 2019. In October 2019, he was named in India B's squad for the 2019–20 Deodhar Trophy.

In February 2022, he was bought by the Kolkata Knight Riders in the auction for the 2022 Indian Premier League tournament. He made his debut for his new side against RR on the 2nd of May, 2022.

References

1998 births
Living people
Indian cricketers
Jharkhand cricketers
Kolkata Knight Riders cricketers